Jordan Becker (born September 25, 1992) is an American soccer player.

Career

College and amateur
Becker played fours years of college soccer at the University of Maryland, Baltimore County between 2011 and 2014.

Becker also played with Premier Development League sides Des Moines Menace, in 2013 to 2014, and Baltimore Bohemians in 2015.

Professional
Becker signed his first professional deal with United Soccer League club Rochester Rhinos on March 18, 2016.

References

1992 births
Living people
American soccer players
UMBC Retrievers men's soccer players
Des Moines Menace players
Baltimore Bohemians players
Rochester New York FC players
USL League Two players
USL Championship players
Soccer players from Maryland
People from Pocomoke City, Maryland
Association football midfielders
Baltimore Blast players
Major Arena Soccer League players
Association football defenders